This is a list of University of Reading alumni.

Academics
 Catherine Abbott - Professor of Molecular Genetics at the University of Edinburgh
 Fatima Akilu – Nigerian psychologist and head of major national program of de-radicalisation to tackle Boko Haram 
 Ash Amin – Professor of Geography, University of Cambridge
 Janet Beer – Vice-Chancellor of the University of Liverpool (formerly Vice-Chancellor of Oxford Brookes University)
 L. J. F. Brimble – botanist and editor of Nature magazine
 Sir Clifford Charles Butler – co-discoverer of hyperons and mesons, Professor of Physics at Imperial College London, Vice-chancellor of Loughborough University
 Stephen E. Calvert – Emeritus Professor of Geology, University of British Columbia
 David Carpanini – Emeritus Professor of Art, University of Wolverhampton
 Michael Cox – Professor of International Relations, London School of Economics
 Sir Peter Crane – Professor of Botany, Yale University
 Beate Hermelin (1920–2008) – German-born experimental psychologist, who worked in the UK
 Sean Holly – Professor of Economics, University of Cambridge
 Jolyon Howorth – Professor of European politics, University of Bath and Visiting Professor of Political Science at Yale University
 Michael Leifer – was a professor of International Relations, London School of Economics
 Jane Lewis - Barnett Professor of Social Policy at the University of Oxford
 David Marks – Professor of Psychology, City University London
 Dragan Marušič – Professor of Mathematics at the University of Ljubljana
 Sarah Mercer - Professor of linguistics at the University of Graz
 Mark Nixon - Emeritus Professor of Electronics and Computer Science at University of Southampton
 Avi Shlaim – Professor of International Relations, University of Oxford
 Nigel Smart (cryptographer)
 John R. Terry – Professor of Biomedical Modelling, University of Exeter
 June Thoburn – Emeritus Professor of Social Work at the University of East Anglia
 Ethelwynn Trewavas – ichthyologist and taxonomist
 John Turner – Professor of Engineering and Pro-Vice Chancellor of the University of Portsmouth
 Janet Watson - geologist
 Sean Whelan (scientist) – Professor of Microbiology at Harvard Medical School
 A. E. Wilder-Smith – creationist and chemist

Broadcasting
 Julian Barratt – comedian, BBC's The Mighty Boosh
 Keith Bosley – former BBC broadcaster and prizewinning poet and translator
 Richard Holmes – military historian and television presenter
 Julian Richards – archaeologist and broadcaster
 Richard Sambrook – Director of the BBC World Service
 Tomasz Schafernaker – TV weather presenter
 Nick Thorpe – BBC Central Europe correspondent (1996–); formerly BBC Budapest correspondent
 Laura Tobin – TV weather presenter
 Jay Wynne – TV weather presenter

Business
 Richard Adam - former finance director of Carillion
 David Atkins – Chief Executive, Hammerson plc
 Linda Bennett OBE - English-Icelandic clothing designer and entrepreneur
 Nick Candy – Co-Founder and partner of high end property development company, Candy & Candy, London
 Gavin Grant – Chief Executive of the Royal Society for the Prevention of Cruelty to Animals
 Nicky Kinnaird – founder and president of British cosmetic retailer Space NK
 Robert Noel – businessman, Chief Executive of Land Securities Group plc
 Noel Stockdale – Co-founder of Asda

Military
 Lieutenant-Colonel Rupert Thorneloe - Welsh Guards officer killed in action in Afghanistan
 Lance Corporal Oliver Thomas - killed in action (2014) in Afghanistan
 Wilfred Owen - First World War poet and soldier

Music

 Rotimi Alakija – Nigerian disc jockey, record producer and recording artist.
 Rick Battersby – member of the band Twelfth Night
 Arthur Brown – rock and roll singer
 Alan Clayson – singer, composer, record producer, leader of the band Clayson and the Argonauts
 Jamie Cullum – jazz pianist and singer
 Brian Devoil – member of the band Twelfth Night
 Falz - Nigerian Musician and actor
 Liam Howe – music producer, musician, formed the band Sneaker pimps with David Westlake and Joe Wilson (musician) also alumni
 Hilary James – singer, double bassist, guitarist, and mando-bassist
 Andy MacKay – member of the band Roxy Music
 Geoff Mann – member of the band Twelfth Night
 Simon Mayor – mandolinist, fiddle player, guitarist, and composer
 Clive Mitten – member of the band Twelfth Night
 Martin Noble – musician, Noble in the band British Sea Power
 Andy Revell – member of the band Twelfth Night
 Edmund Rubbra – composer
 Julian Wagstaff – composer
 Scott Wilkinson – musician and composer, Yan in the band British Sea Power

Politics
 Anton Apriantono, Indonesian politician
 Dimeji Bankole – Nigerian politician and Speaker of the House of Representatives of Nigeria
 Sharon Bowles, British Liberal Democrats European politician.
 Daniel Feetham, Gibraltarian politician 
 Fred Gardiner, Canadian politician
Gilbert Seidu Iddi, Ghanaian politician
 Edison James, Prime Minister of Dominica 1995–2000
 Morgan Jones, British Labour Party politician, the first conscientious objector to be elected to Parliament after the First World War
 Shukuru Kawambwa, Tanzanian Government Minister 
 Jan Kavan, Czech diplomat and politician
Penny Mordaunt, British Conservative Party politician 
 Mike Penning, British Conservative Party politician
 Frauke Petry, German Politician
 Mark Prisk, British Conservative Party politician
 Hugh Robertson, British Conservative Party politician
 Adrienne Ryan - Australian politician
 Sophie Walker, British Women's Equality Party politician
 Rob Wilson, British Conservative Party politician

Sport

 David Bedford – runner
 Cath Bishop – rower, silver medallist in the coxless pairs at the 2004 Olympics
 James Cracknell – rower, gold medallist in the coxless fours at the 2000 Olympics and 2004 Olympics
 Adrian Ellison - rower, gold medallist in the coxed four at the 1984 Olympics
 Debbie Flood – rower, silver medallist in the quadruple sculls at the 2004 Olympics
 Alex Gregory - rower, gold medallist in the coxless fours at the 2012 Olympics
 Gary Herbert – rower, gold medallist in the coxed pairs at the 1992 Olympics
 Molly Hide – cricketer, captained the English women's team for seventeen years
 Will Hoy – racing driver, British Touring Car Champion in 1991
 Bill Lucas - rower
 Anna Watkins – rower, gold medallist in the double sculls at the 2012 Olympics

Writing and art
 Steven Atkinson – theatre director, and artistic director of HighTide Festival Theatre
 Anne Bean – installation and performance artist
 Audrey Blackman - sculptor, potter 
 Jane Carpanini – artist
 Vincent Connare – creator of Comic Sans
 Jeff Evans – beer writer
 Cherryl Fountain artist
 Robert Gillmor – ornithologist, artist, illustrator, author and editor
 Elizabeth Goudge - Carnegie Medal winning novelist
 Kathleen Hale – artist and children's author, the Orlando the Marmalade Cat series
 Myfanwy Kitchin – artist
 Ingrid Kerma - European Artist
 Alan Morrison - poet
 Mike Nelson – installation artist
 Yvonne Adhiambo Owuor Award winning Kenyan writer of Luo Nationality
 Kusha Petts – artist and writer
 Joan Smith – novelist and journalist
 Hilary Summers Welsh singer
 David Watkins – designer of the London 2012 Olympics medals
 Richard Wilson – installation artist

Others
 Lorna Arnold - British historian
 Eve Balfour – farmer, educator, organic farming pioneer, and a founding figure in the organic movement
 Robin Bextor – film and television director, father of Sophie Ellis-Bextor
 Pippa Greenwood - TV plant pathologist
 Bunny Guinness - landscape architect
 Azahari Husin – leading member of the Jemaah Islamiyah group, believed to have been involved in the 2005 Bali bombing
 Clive Ponting – civil servant who faced trial for the leaking of information on the sinking of the Belgrano, during the Falklands War
 John Tabatabai – professional poker player
 Wei Tang – actress, Ang Lee's Lust, Caution
 Ibrahim Taguri - British community worker
 Rachel Treweek – Bishop of Gloucester; the first female diocesan bishop in the Church of England, and first female Lord Spiritual
 Carl Wright - civil servant former director of the Commonwealth Trade Union Group and Secretary-General of the Commonwealth Local Government Forum

References

 
University of Reading
Reading